Laysan, located  northwest of Honolulu at , is one of the Northwestern Hawaiian Islands. Laysan's Hawaiian name, Kauō, means egg.

Geology
Laysan is the second largest single landmass in the Northwestern Hawaiian Islands, after Sand Island at Midway Atoll. Laysan was created by coral growth and geologic upshift. The best way to find fresh water on Laysan is to observe where the finches are drinking; the fresh water floats on the saltier water and accumulates around the shore.

A U.S. Geological Survey study found that Laysan, Midway Atoll, and Pacific islands like them could become inundated and unfit to live on during the 21st century.

History

Discovery and early expeditions
Native Hawaiians may have known about Kauō before Americans and Europeans sailed their ships into the region in the early 19th century (see below). The first reported sightings of the island were by Massachusetts whalers in the 1820s. The Nantucket Enquirer reported a sighting in 1825. Here one probably finds the first reference to the name Laysan in print. They were among many who took advantage of the newly discovered whaling grounds off the coast of Japan, making the waters around the Northwest Hawaiian archipelago an increasingly popular commercial route. A United States government survey of Pacific Ocean geography in 1828 included the earlier whalers' reports and an additional sighting of an island fitting Laysan's description by Capt. "Brigs." This may refer to Capt. John Briggs of New Bedford, who may have come across the island as early as 1822. Various publications name Capt. Stanyukovich of the Russian ship Moller as the discoverer of Laysan. Although he mapped the island in 1828 and attempted to name it for his ship, he clearly was there after the New Englanders, at least.

In 1857, Capt. John Paty of the Manuokawai annexed Laysan to the Kingdom of Hawaii.

The island held an economic value in guano. In 1859, Capt. Brooks of the ship Gambia traveled to the island, and in his ship log wrote that there was guano there, but "not of sufficient quantity to warrant any attempts to get it." Despite this estimate, in 1890 George D. Freeth and Charles N. Spencer successfully petitioned the Kingdom of Hawaii for permission to mine guano on Laysan and agreed to make royalty payments to the Kingdom. Around  were extracted per day. Given that iron-hulled sailing ships towards the end of the guano mining era had a capacity of 5,000 tons, Laysan produced a shipload every two months.

The working condition at the guano mine was grueling. In August 1900, Japanese workers mutinied against American management. At first the workers refused to work. That strike action turned to violence because of a language barrier. As a result, there were two deaths and two injuries.

This newfound attention to Laysan attracted scientists, and in the next decade, many of Laysan's unique species were scientifically examined for the first time. However, guano digging affected the island's ecosystem dramatically. Professor William Alanson Bryan of the Bernice P. Bishop Museum estimated that there were 10 million seabirds on Laysan in 1903, but eight years later the estimation was at little more than a million. In those eight years, the Pritchardia palms that were unique to Laysan, and the island's sandalwood trees (Santalum ellipticum) both became extinct.

1894 marked the arrival of Laysan's most notorious inhabitant, German immigrant Max Schlemmer. Schlemmer released domestic rabbits, Belgian hares, English hares and guinea pigs on the island, expecting them to multiply, and provide supplies for a future meat-canning business. This proved to be crucial in the decline of Laysan.

Period of extinction
The rabbits did reproduce rapidly. Soon, the appetite of the rabbits far exceeded the available vegetation on the Laysan island. Complaints about this and about Japanese poachers of the bird population led President Theodore Roosevelt to declare the Northwestern Hawaiian chain a bird sanctuary in 1909.  Schlemmer continued to allow the Japanese to export bird wings illegally and so was removed from the island. But without plant cover, much of the soil and sand became loose and blew about in dust storms. By 1918, the rabbits had eaten so much that the remaining vegetation was only enough to sustain 100 rabbits. Twenty-six plant species had been eradicated, and the Laysan millerbird had gone extinct.

In 1923, the Tanager Expedition arrived, and the rabbits were exterminated at long last. The bird population had been reduced to about a tenth of its former size. Three endemic taxa had become extinct, as had numerous other plant species. Two other endemic species, the Laysan duck and the Laysan finch, survive to this day, but are endangered.

Recent history
Like most of the Northwestern Hawaiian islands, Laysan is currently uninhabited.  It is protected by the Hawaiian Natural Life Act of 1961 and cared for by the U.S. Fish and Wildlife Service, who have had success in eliminating pests, restoring the island to almost pre-desert state, and restoring the numbers of imperiled species.

Garbage from passing ships often washes ashore on Laysan. This poses a  danger to birds because they can swallow plastic waste, which remains undigested and crowds the stomach, leaving no room for actual food. Curiously, most of the plastic found  is Japanese in origin. Additionally, in the 1990s, biologists found that a container of poisonous carbofuran had floated to shore and burst open above the high tide line, creating a "dead zone" which killed anything alive that went near it.

Sandbur eradication
In 1991, the United States Fish and Wildlife Service started an effort to eradicate alien sandbur, a grass that crowds out the native bunchgrass, which is habitat for the birds. Sandbur was first introduced in the 1960s by US Armed Forces personnel. Costing almost one million dollars, the project ended in 2000 when the sandbur was completely removed. With this threat gone, the USFWS hopes to restore Laysan to how it was before it was discovered. To replace the native Pritchardia palms that became extinct, the FWS wants to bring in Pritchardia remota from Nihoa, a similar species to Laysan's lost fan palm. Next may be Nihoa millerbirds, to replace the extinct Laysan millerbirds that were closely related. These transfers would accomplish a two-fold goal: to restore Laysan to an ecology similar to its pre-industrial one, and to protect those two species from extinction by maintaining a second population on Laysan. That way, if diseases, fires, or hurricanes obliterate the Nihoa population, the population can be revived by transplanting some from Laysan.

"Laysan fever"
In 1991, several workers on Laysan contracted a feverish illness previously unknown there or anywhere else. It affected workers on Laysan in varying levels of severity: one woman was evacuated for persistent fever, but others exhibited very mild symptoms. Cedric Yoshimoto, of the University of Hawaii at Mānoa School of Public Health, wrote that "surveillance has identified a newly-described illness of humans termed 'Laysan fever (LF)' It is associated with bites of the seabird tick Ornithodoros capensis... [and] joins a short list of human illnesses associated with seabird colonies..." The symptoms of Q fever overlap significantly with those of Laysan fever, and scientists have speculated as to their possible common causes.

Possible ancient Hawaiian presence
In 2003, an archaeologist examining sediment cores found pollen from coconut palms deep below the bottom of the central lagoon. This unexpected find raises several issues. Heretofore, no evidence existed that the coconut ever reached any of the Hawaiian Islands before the arrival of the Polynesian voyagers. Further, there has never been any physical evidence that the ancient Hawaiians extended their explorations of the Hawaiian chain beyond Nihoa and Mokumanamana (Necker). Dating the sediment containing the Cocos pollen is imprecise, but appears to be somewhere between 5,500 years ago, and the arrival of Europeans in Hawaiian waters in the late 18th century. Coconut pollen was not found in the deeper (older) part of the core. However, cores from Guam in the western Pacific show the presence of coconut trees there as early as 9,000 years ago, well before human habitation. Hawaiian traditions suggest that the Hawaiians were aware that islands existed to the northwest, and the pollen evidence could be interpreted as proof of early Hawaiian visitation to Laysan. Clearly, more precise dating of the sediment layers will be crucial to better interpreting this find.

Distinctive species of Laysan

Laysan is generally regarded as the "gem" of the NWHI, with the most biodiversity. It is home to the Laysan duck, the rarest duck in the world. The other native land bird of Laysan is the Laysan finch, an opportunistic hunter. Eighteen other bird species nest here and use Lake Laysan, the only lake in the NWHI, as a rest stop or breeding ground. Laysan also has its share of native plants, many of which, such as Eragrostis variabilis, were extirpated from Laysan during its extinction period and then reintroduced by scientists afterwards, from other leeward islands. Like most other of the NWHI, Laysan is home to Hawaiian monk seals and green sea turtles.

Birds
Laysan finch, Telespiza cantans – endemic
Laysan duck, Anas laysanensis – endemic
Laysan albatross, Phoebastria immutabilis – nearly endemic
Black-footed albatross,  Phoebastria nigripes
Short-tailed albatross, Phoebastria albatrus
Great frigatebird, Fregata minor
Lesser frigatebird, Fregata ariel
White tern (or "fairy tern"), Gygis alba
Sooty tern, Onychoprion fuscatus
Spectacled tern, Onychoprion lunata
Bristle-thighed curlew, Numenius tahitiensis
Pacific golden plover, Pluvialis fulva
Christmas shearwater, Puffinus nativitatis
Red-tailed tropicbird, Phaethon rubricauda rothschildi
Brown noddy, Anous stolidus
Black noddy, Anous minutus melangogenys
Masked booby, Sula dactylatra
Brown booby, Sula leucogaster
Red-footed booby, Sula sula rubripes
Bonin petrel, Pterodroma hypoleuca
Laysan rail, Porzana palmeri – extinct, endemic
Laysan honeycreeper Himatione fraithii – extinct, endemic
Laysan millerbird, Acrocephalus familiaris familiaris – extinct, endemic

Insects
 Laysan dropseed noctuid moth, (Hypena laysanensis) – extinct
 Laysan noctuid moth, (Agrotis laysanensis)
 Procellaris grotis noctuid moth, (Agrotis procellaris)
 Laysan weevil, (Oedemasylus laysanensis) – extinct

See also

 Desert island
 List of islands

Notes

References

 TenBruggencate, J. 2005. "Coconut pollen found on Laysan". Honolulu Advertiser, Monday, May 23, 2005, p. B1-2.
Rauzon, Mark J. (2001), Isles of Refuge: Wildlife and History of the Northwestern Hawaiian Islands, University of Hawaii Press, .
Greene, Patricia (2006). "Death of a Laysan Albatross Chick." 
Liittschwager, David & Middleton, Susan (2005), Archipelago: Portraits of Life in the World's Most Remote Sanctuary, National Geographic, .

External links

 Laysan Island: Confused History
 Ecological description of Laysan
 History of Laysan
 Quick Facts on Laysan Island from the PBS Ocean Adventures site
 Papahānaumokuākea Marine National Monument Information Management System
 Google Street View July 2013
 Laysan Island Cyclorama at the University of Iowa

Northwestern Hawaiian Islands
Atolls of Hawaii
Hawaiian–Emperor seamount chain
Seabird colonies
Island restoration
Former populated places in Oceania
Miocene volcanoes
Paleogene Oceania
Cenozoic Hawaii
Important Bird Areas of Hawaii
Endemic Bird Areas